"Run Me My Money" is a song by American rapper Joseline Hernandez. It was released on October 8, 2017 by All Puerto Rican Princess Records.

Background and release
After giving birth to her first daughter Bonnie Bella, VH1 aired the Joseline's Special Delivery as a part of the sixth season of the Love & Hip Hop: Atlanta installment. In June 2017, it was reported that after six seasons Hernandez decided to quit the Love & Hip Hop reality series amid a feud with producer Mona Scott-Young.

On August 6, 2017, Hernandez posted snippets of the songs "Run Me My Money" and "Mi Cualto" on her Instagram account, along with a tag #MONAFEA ("fea" meaning "ugly" in Spanish). It was immediately reported that "Run Me My Money" is a diss record aimed at Scott-Young. Hernandez commented "My first half of my royalties were supposed to go through. [...] The show people, let's just get this very clear, all them bitches that go through Love & Hip Hop, they work for me. I get royalties on all them asses, so that was the inspiration." However, she did not directly confirm whether she was taking aim at Scott-Young.

Credits and personnel

 Joseline Hernandez – songwriting
 Demetrius Shane – production, songwriting

Release history

References

2017 singles
2017 songs
Diss tracks
Joseline Hernandez songs